Stefania Reindl (24 February 1922 – 11 March 1993) was a Polish artistic gymnast. She competed at the 1952 Summer Olympics.

References

1922 births
1993 deaths
Polish female artistic gymnasts
Gymnasts at the 1952 Summer Olympics
Olympic gymnasts of Poland
Medalists at the World Artistic Gymnastics Championships
Sportspeople from Kraków